Edward William Abel,  (3 December 1931 – 19 April 2021) was a British chemist, editor of textbooks on organometallic chemistry and president of the Royal Society of Chemistry (1996-1998).

He was appointed a Commander of the Order of the British Empire (CBE) in the 1997 Queen's Birthday Honours, for services to chemistry.

References

People from Glamorgan
Presidents of the Royal Society of Chemistry
Commanders of the Order of the British Empire
20th-century British chemists
1931 births
2021 deaths